Ridgway is a village in Gallatin County, Illinois, United States. As of the 2020 census, the population was 851. As of 2018, Rebecca Mitchell was the town mayor.

History
Ridgway was established in 1866 as a construction camp along what would become the Springfield and Illinois South Eastern Railway.  It was named for the railroad's president, Thomas S. Ridgway.

The village, once home to a popcorn plant, is the former self-proclaimed "Popcorn Capital of the World". Popcorn Day continues as part of the Gallatin County Fair and is held the second Saturday in September.

The February 2012 tornadoes, which killed seven in the nearby Harrisburg area, destroyed the St. Joseph's Catholic Church in Ridgway. The church was rebuilt in 2015 under the name "St. Kateri," in honor of Kateri Tekakwitha.

Geography
Ridgway is located in southern Illinois at  (37.798036, -88.260571), north of Shawnee National Forest. The village is concentrated along Ridgway Newhaven Road, just east of Illinois Route 1.

Demographics

As of the census of 2000, there were 928 people, 441 households, and 271 families residing in the village. The racial makeup of the village was 55.35% White, 34.32% Native American, 0.22% African American, and 0.11% from two or more races. Hispanic or Latino of any race were 0.54% of the population.

There were 441 households, out of which 21.1% had children under the age of 18 living with them, 49.9% were married couples living together, 9.5% had a female householder with no husband present, and 38.5% were non-families. 35.6% of all households were made up of individuals, and 21.5% had someone living alone who was 65 years of age or older.  The average household size was 2.10 and the average family size was 2.72.

In the village, the population was spread out, with 18.0% under the age of 18, 8.2% from 18 to 24, 23.7% from 25 to 44, 27.2% from 45 to 64, and 23.0% who were 65 years of age or older.  The median age was 45 years. For every 100 females, there were 89.0 males.  For every 100 females age 18 and over, there were 87.4 males.

The median income for a household in the village was $27,670, and the median income for a family was $36,786. Males had a median income of $31,944 versus $19,500 for females. The per capita income for the village was $16,959.  About 19% of families and 10% of the population were below the poverty line, including 35.1% of those under age 18 and 12.3% of those age 65 or over.

References

Further reading
 1887. History of Gallatin, Saline, Hamilton, Franklin and Williamson Counties, Illinois. Chicago: Goodspeed Publishing Co.
 Lawler, Lucille. 1968. Gallatin County: Gateway to Illinois. Privately published. 153 pages.
 Lawler, Lucille. 1971. Ridgway, Our Town. Privately published. 43 pages.
 Musgrave, Jon, ed. 2002. Handbook of Old Gallatin County and Southeastern Illinois]. Marion, Ill.: [http://www.illinoishistory.com/ IllinoisHistory.com. 464 pages.

External links

Villages in Gallatin County, Illinois
Villages in Illinois